Metaphor: The Tree of Utah, sometimes called the Tree of Life, is an  sculpture that was created by the Swedish artist Karl Momen in the 1980s and dedicated in 1986. The sculpture, which is constructed mainly of concrete, consists of a squarish 'trunk' holding up six spheres that are coated with natural rock and minerals native to Utah. There are also several hollow sphere segments on the ground around the base. The sculpture currently has a fence surrounding the base to protect people from falling tiles.

Inscribed on the plaque are the words from Ode to Joy by Friedrich Schiller; also used as the chorus of Beethoven's Ninth Symphony. It has been said that Momen was moved to create the  tree after having a vision of a tree while driving across the desolate Bonneville Salt Flats.

Following the dedication of this work of art, Momen donated the sculpture to the State of Utah and returned to Sweden. However, in 2011 he proposed creating a visitors center at the location with construction costs being paid for by donations.

See also
 Sun Tunnels
 Spiral Jetty
 Utah monolith

References

External links

 Metaphor: The Tree of Utah by Utah Travel Council
 Metaphor: The Tree of Utah by Roadside America
 Utah Pictures - Bonneville Salt Flats by Utah Pictures.com

1986 sculptures
Outdoor sculptures in Utah
Concrete sculptures in Utah
Interstate 80
Tourist attractions in Tooele County, Utah
1986 establishments in Utah